Veronica L. Turner (born February 7, 1950) is an American politician who represents District 26 in the Maryland House of Delegates.

Background
Turner was born in Washington, D.C. on February 7, 1950. She attended Prince George's Community College, Tennessee State University, and the George Meany Center for Labor Studies. From 1996 to 2018, Turner served as the president of Service Employees International Union (SEIU) Local 63.

After the death of Prince George's County councilmember James C. Fletcher Jr. in 1994, Turner unsuccessfully ran in the special election to serve the rest of his term. She unsuccessfully ran again for the County Council in 2002, losing to Tony Knotts in the Democratic primary by just over 200 votes.

In the legislature
Turner was a member of the House of Delegates January 8, 2003 to January 14, 2015. Turner declined to run for re-election in 2014, instead running for Maryland Senate and challenging incumbent state Senator C. Anthony Muse. She lost to Muse in the Democratic primary election, coming 2,000 votes shy of defeating him.

Turner was re-elected to the House of Delegates in 2018 and was sworn in on January 9, 2019.

Committee assignments
 Member, Economic Matters Committee, 2019–present (business regulation subcommittee, 2020–present; property & casualty insurance subcommittee, 2020–present)
 Member, Ways and Means Committee, 2019 (education subcommittee, 2019; election law subcommittee, 2019)
 Member, Health and Government Operations Committee, 2003–2015 (government operations subcommittee, 2003–04; health occupations subcommittee, 2003–2004; public health subcommittee, 2003–2005; health insurance subcommittee, 2004; insurance subcommittee, 2004; health facilities, equipment & products subcommittee, 2005; health facilities & occupations subcommittee, 2005–2010; public health & long-term care subcommittee, 2005–2015; minority health disparities subcommittee, 2011–2015)
 Member, Joint Committee on Health Care Delivery and Financing, 2005–2014
 Member, Joint Committee on Children, Youth, and Families, 2011–2015
 House Vice-Chair, Protocol Committee, 2014–2015

Other memberships
 2nd Vice-chair, Prince George's County Delegation, 2012–2014 (law enforcement & state-appointed boards committee, 2003–07; bi-county committee, 2008–2010; vice-chair, maryland-national capital park & planning commission committee, 2008–2010; vice-chair, county affairs committee, 2011–2012, member, 2013–2015)
 Member, Legislative Black Caucus of Maryland, 2003–2015, 2019–present (2nd vice-chair, 2004–2006; 1st vice-chair, 2006–2008; chair, 2008–2010)
 Member, Women Legislators of Maryland, 2003–2015, 2019–present (endorsement committee, 2006)

Political positions

Health care
Turner introduced legislation in the 2005 legislative session that would limit the amount of patients that nurses could care for. The bill was withdrawn on March 18, 2005.

Social issues
Turner supported the Civil Marriage Protection Act, a bill to legalize same-sex marriage in Maryland, but was unable to vote for it because she had an emergency surgery for a serious illness on the day of the vote. The bill passed the House of Delegates by a vote of 72-67 and was signed into law by Governor Martin O'Malley on March 2, 2012.

In January 2019, Turner voted for legislation to lift a ban on developer contributions in county political races. The bill passed out of committee by a vote of 18-5.

Electoral history

References 

Democratic Party members of the Maryland House of Delegates
1950 births
Living people
Tennessee State University alumni
Women state legislators in Maryland
African-American state legislators in Maryland
African-American women in politics
21st-century American politicians
21st-century American women politicians
21st-century African-American women
21st-century African-American politicians
20th-century African-American people
20th-century African-American women